Sarchak-e Dadabad (also Romanized as Sarchak-e Dādābād; also known as Sarchak-e Dādābād-e ‘Olyā, Dādābād-e ‘Olyā, and Mīr Kūchak‘alī-ye Dādābād) is a village in Koregah-e Gharbi Rural District, in the Central District of Khorramabad County, Lorestan Province, Iran. At the 2006 census, its population was 130, in 24 families.

References 

Towns and villages in Khorramabad County